Baigneux-les-Juifs is a commune in the Côte-d'Or department in the Bourgogne-Franche-Comté region of Central-Eastern France.

The inhabitants of the commune are known as Bagnosiens.

Geography
Baigneux-les-Juifs is located some 25 km east by south-east of Montbard and 10 km south-west of Aignay-le-Duc. Access to the commune is by the D 971 road from Saint-Marc-sur-Seine in the north which passes through the commune east of the village and continues south to Chanceaux. The D 21 branches off the D 971 in the commune and goes north-east, passing through the village, and continuing to Jours-lès-Baigneux. The D 954 goes west from the village to Étormay. The D 114A branches off the D 971 at the D 21 intersection and goes east to Orret. The commune is entirely farmland.

Neighbouring communes and villages

Climate
Baigneux-les-Juifs has a oceanic climate (Köppen climate classification Cfb).

History

In the Middle Ages the village was called Bagnos, probably from the Latin Balneolum meaning "small bath". This name was completed after a Jewish community was allowed to settle there in the 13th century. This community was permanently driven out by the Dukes of Burgundy in the 15th century.

From 1895 to 1933 the commune had a narrow gauge railway operated by the Chemins de fer départementaux de la Côte-d'Or (Departmental Railway of Côte-d'Or) (CDCO) which connected the village to Châtillon-sur-Seine.

Heraldry

Administration

List of Successive Mayors

Demography
In 2017 the commune had 242 inhabitants.

Culture and heritage

Civil heritage
The commune has many buildings and sites that are registered as historical monuments:
Houses (16th-18th century). One of the houses contains a Statue of Christ bound (1760) which is registered as an historical object.
The Hôtel de la Croix de Fer (Hotel of the Iron Cross) at RN454 (16th century)
A Lavoir (Public laundry) (1869)
The Town Hall/School (19th century)

Religious heritage

The commune has many religious buildings and sites that are registered as historical monuments:
Wayside Crosses
Monumental Crosses (15th century)
A Cemetery Cross (16th century)
The Sainte-Anne Oratory south of the village (1810). The Oratory contains a Group Sculpture of the Education of the Virgin (16th century) which is registered as an historical object.
The Ermitage de Val de Seine (1633). The Ermitrage (Retreat) contains many items that are registered as historical objects:
The Tombstone of Jehan le Grant (1478)
A Cross (18th century)
A Statue: Saint Joseph and the child Jesus (17th century)
A Statue: Saint-Madeleine (17th century) (Stolen in 1979)
A Statue: Saint-Sebastien (17th century) (Stolen in 1979)
A Statue: Saint-Laurent (16th century) (Stolen in 1979)
A Statuette: Saint-Antoine the Hermit (15th century) (Stolen in 1979)
A Statue: Christ bound (16th century) (Stolen in 1979)
A recessed Placard (19th century)
A Stoup (17th century)
An Altar painting: the Annunciation (17th century)
An Altar, Retable, and Tabernacle (17th century)
A Presbytery (18th century)
The Parish Church of Sainte-Madeleine (13th century) The Church contains a large number of items that are registered as historical objects.

Notable people linked to the commune
Louis Beguin (1747-1831), Mayor of Baigneux-les-Juifs then administrator and MP for Côte-d'Or

See also
Communes of the Côte-d'Or department

References

External links
Baigneux-les-Juifs on Géoportail, National Geographic Institute (IGN) website 
Baigneux-les-Juifs on the 1750 Cassini Map

Communes of Côte-d'Or